A clown bicycle or clown bike is a bicycle designed for comedic visual effect or stunt riding, typically by circus clowns.  It is sometimes called a circus bike.

Types of clown bike 
BMX bicycle
bucking bike (with one or more eccentric wheels); 
Come-apart bike, (essentially a unicycle, plus a set of handlebars attached to forks and a wheel).  
small wheel bicycle
tall bike (often called an upside down bike, constructed so that the pedals, seat and handlebars are all higher than normal) 
tiny bicycle

Some clown bikes are also fixed gear, with no freewheeling, so that they may be pedaled either forward or backwards. Some are built very small but are otherwise relatively normal. Pedaling an extremely small bicycle is very difficult and usually much slower than walking, so there is little practical advantage to having a bicycle that will fit in one's purse or pocket.

See also 
 List of bicycle types
 Art bike
 Clown car

External links 
The Clown House, a house in northeast Portland, Oregon, that is home to many clown bikes.

Circus equipment
Clowning
Cycle types
Art vehicles
Modified vehicles